This is a list of the central banks and currencies of the Caribbean.

There are a number of currencies serving multiple territories; the most widespread are the East Caribbean dollar (8 countries and territories), the United States dollar (5) and the euro (4).

Surrounding countries and territories

See also 

 List of banks
 Economy of the Caribbean
 Currencies of the British West Indies
 International status and usage of the euro
 List of countries by leading trade partners
 List of Latin American and Caribbean countries by GDP growth
 List of Latin American and Caribbean countries by GDP (nominal)
 List of Latin American and Caribbean countries by GDP (PPP)

References

 
Caribbean